Talavera Club de Fútbol was a Spanish football team based in Talavera de la Reina, in the autonomous community of Castile-La Mancha. Founded in 1948, it played its last season in Tercera División - Group 18, holding home matches at Estadio El Prado, with a 6,000-seat capacity.

History
Talavera CF was founded in 1948, spending its first 34 years of existence fluctuating between the regional leagues and the fourth division. In 1982, it reached level three for the first time ever, going on to last four years in the category.

In 1993, Talavera returned to division three, for a much longer spell (15 seasons, with two unsuccessful promotion playoff appearances), being relegated at the end of the 2007–08 campaign. In August 2010, shortly before the beginning of the new season, in a special meeting, the club was dissolved due to overwhelming financial problems, owing wages to both players and managers from several seasons, with the club having a debt of more than €2 million; its place was taken by Tomelloso CF.

Season to season

19 seasons in Segunda División B
25 seasons in Tercera División

Famous players
 Uriel Bartolucci
 Fabrice Moreau
 Antonio Anero
 Mariano García Remón

References

External links
Official website 
Futbolme team profile 

Association football clubs established in 1948
Association football clubs disestablished in 2010
Defunct football clubs in Castilla–La Mancha
1948 establishments in Spain
2010 disestablishments in Spain
Sport in Talavera de la Reina